Clear Creek Wildlife Management Area is a 54,269-acre tract of protected area located in Vernon Parish, Louisiana. The Louisiana Department of Wildlife and Fisheries (LDWF) leases the land from Hancock Timber.

History
The land formally belonged to Forest Capital Partners, LLC, and was purchased, by Molpus Woodlands Group and The Hancock Timber Resource Group (Hancock Timber) in a 1.88 million acre land deal.

Location
The property is bordered on the north by LA 8 (west of Anacoco Lake) and LA 111, that runs from Burr Ferry, through Evans towards Merryville, forms the western border, with the WMA crossing the highway in three areas in the southern half. The eastern and southern border is Bayou Anacoco that drains into the Sabine River (Texas–Louisiana). LA 464 runs diagonally northeast to southwest through the WMA.

Description
The WMA is planted predominantly with company timber land, criss-crossed by several parish roads, oil field roads, and other gravel roads, with a sand pit and logging pond on the property.  There is what is now called a cultural lookout tower known locally as the Evans lookout tower, also referred to as the Evans fire tower.

Like named areas
 Clear Creek Conservation Area in Vernon County, Missouri.
 Clear Creek State Park in Pennsylvania
 Clear Creek (Atlanta)
 Clear Creek State Forest in Pennsylvania

Clear Creek Trail in Grand Canyon National Park
Clear Creek (Colorado)
Clear Creek Campground in Grant Parish, Louisiana.
Clear Creek Campground, Pollock, Louisiana, in Kisatchie National Forest east of US 165, and northwest of Camp Beauregard and the Camp Beauregard Wildlife Management Area.

See also
Clear Creek (disambiguation)

References

Wildlife management areas of the United States

Protected areas of Louisiana
Geography of Vernon Parish, Louisiana
Wildlife management areas of Louisiana